Corycus was a Greek port city in ancient Lycia. The location of the city has not been determined with certainty. This is a short distance north of the modern town Çıralı in the Kumluca district of Antalya Province, Turkey.

The city is mentioned by the Stadiasmus Patarensis and the Stadiasmus Maris Magni. Mustafa Adak has argued that the name of Corycus was eventually changed to Olympos, after the original city of Olympus had been destroyed by the Roman Republic. According to him Olympus was initially founded on Mount Olympus, which he identifies as Musa Dağı instead of Tahtalı Dağı. After the destruction the population would have moved to Corycus. The name change might have happened when Hadrian visited the city in 131 AD.

References

Sources 

 

Seleucid colonies in Anatolia
Former populated places in Turkey
Populated places in ancient Lycia
Roman sites in Turkey
Lost ancient cities and towns